John Rand (November 19, 1871 – January 24, 1940) was an American actor who started his film career in the 1910s, and most notably supported Charles Chaplin in over 20 of his subjects.

Filmography

External links

1871 births
1940 deaths
American male silent film actors
20th-century American male actors
Place of birth missing